This is a timeline of women's education. It includes people, institutions, law reforms and events associated with the education of women in history worldwide.

1200s
1237

 Italy: Bettisia Gozzadini earns a law degree at the University of Bologna.

1239

 Italy: Bettisia Gozzadini teaches law at the University of Bologna. First woman believed to teach at a university (first university established in 1088).

1300s 

 Italy: Dorotea Bucca holds a chair of medicine and philosophy in the University of Bologna for 40 years from 1390.
 Italy: Novella d'Andrea teaches law at the University of Bologna.
 Italy: Virdimura of Catania obtained a royal medical license to practice medicine on 7 November 1376, after an examination by the doctors of the royal court.

1400s

 Italy: Constance Calenda (fl. 1415) may have received a medical degree from the University of Naples Federico II.

1500s 

 Spain: Luisa de Medrano teaches at the University of Salamanca and writes works of philosophy, now lost.
 Spain: Isabella Losa gets a D.D. (Doctor of Divinity) theology degree.
 Spain: Francisca de Lebrija teaches rhetorics at the University of Alcalá.
 Spain: Beatriz Galindo excels in Latin, studies at one of the institutions dependent on the University of Salamanca, writes commentary on Aristotle and becomes a teacher of the queen.
 Spain: Real Colegio de Doncellas Nobles is founded in 1551.
 Sweden: The Swedish Church Ordinance 1571 stipulate that both boys and girls should be given basic schooling such as to learn how to read, write and count as well as how to manage some kind of basic commercial skill.

1600s
1608
 Spain: Juliana Morell "defended theses" in 1606 or 1607 in Lyon or maybe Avignon, although claims that she received a doctorate in canon law in 1608 have been discredited. According to Lope de Vega, she taught "all the sciences from professorial chairs".

1636
 Netherlands: German-born Dutch Anna Maria van Schurman, proficient in 14 languages, studied as the first female student at Utrecht University, Netherlands, but without obtaining a degree.

1639
 Acadia: The French colony of Acadia, which at the time included part of Maine, had an Ursuline boarding school by 1639 that was geared toward the education of young girls. The school was founded in Quebec City and is still in operation today, though this part of Canada no longer includes the part of Maine that it once did.

1644
 Sweden: First female college students, Ursula Agricola and Maria Jonae Palmgren.

1674
  New Spain: In this year, Bishop Calderon of Santiago wrote to Queen Mother Maria Anna concerning the Spanish efforts at colonizing Florida. In his letter he included some comments about the state of education and stated, "The children, both male and female, go to church on work days, to a religious school where they are taught by a teacher whom they call Athequi of the church; [a person] whom the priests have for this service." This description indicates that the colonies of New Spain had facilities for female education at least by the 1600s. It is not clear how far back this goes; the 1512 laws of Burgos, from over a hundred years earlier, did not specify whether instruction should be for males only: it uses the word hijos, which means sons, but can include daughters if they are mixed in with the boys.

1678
 Italy: Elena Cornaro Piscopia, an Italian woman, earns a Ph.D. (Doctor of Philosophy) degree from the University of Padua in Italy and is said to have taught mathematics at the University of Padua.

1684
 France: The Maison royale de Saint-Louis is founded.

1685
 Italy: Rosa Venerini opens the first free school for girls in Italy, in the town of Viterbe.

1698
 Germany: The first secular secondary education girls' school in Germany is established by the Pietist August Hermann Francke in Halle, and becomes a pioneer institution for a number of girls schools in Germany during the 18th-century.

1700s
1727
 United States: Founded in 1727 by the Sisters of the Order of Saint Ursula, Ursuline Academy, New Orleans, is both the oldest continuously operating school for girls and the oldest Catholic school in the United States. The Ursuline Sisters founded this school out of the conviction that the education of women was essential to the development of a civilized, spiritual and just society, and has influenced culture and learning in New Orleans by providing an education for its women.

1732
 Italy: Laura Bassi, an Italian woman, earned a Ph.D. degree at the University of Bologna in Italy, and taught physics at the same university. She was the first woman to have a doctorate in science. Working at the University of Bologna, she was also the first salaried woman teacher in a university, and at one time she was the highest paid employee. She was also the first woman member of any scientific establishment, when she was elected to the Academy of Sciences of the Institute of Bologna in 1732.

1742
 United States: At only 16 years of age, Countess Benigna von Zinzendorf established the first all-girls boarding school in America, sponsored by her father Count Nicholas von Zinzendorf. Originally known as the Bethlehem Female Seminary upon its 1742 founding, it changed its name to Moravian Seminary and College for Women by 1913. 1863 proved the Germantown, Pennsylvania-based school's most landmark year, however, when the state recognized it as a college and granted it permission to reward bachelor's degrees. As a result, most tend to accept Moravian as the oldest—though not continuously operational because of its current co-ed status—specifically female institute of higher learning in the United States.

1751
 Italy: Cristina Roccati became the third woman to receive a Ph.D. degree in Italy.

1764
 Russia: Foundation of the Smolny Institute.

1765
 Russia: Foundation of the Novodevichii Institute.

1783
 United States: Washington College in Chestertown, Maryland, appointed the first women instructors at any American college or university, Elizabeth Callister Peale and Sarah Callister, members of the famous Peale family of artists. They taught painting and drawing.

1786
 Russia: Catherine the Great opened free public primary and high school education to girls.

1787
 Germany: Dorothea von Rodde-Schlözer became the first German woman to earn a PhD from the University of Göttingen.
 Sweden: Societetsskolan is founded.
 Denmark: J. Cl. Todes Døtreskole is founded.

1788
 Sweden: Aurora Liljenroth became the first female college graduate.

1791
 Denmark: One of the first schools for females of any note was the Døtreskolen af 1791.

1800s

1800–1849
1803
 United States: Bradford Academy in Bradford, Massachusetts, was the first higher educational institution to admit women in Massachusetts. It was founded as a co-educational institution, but became exclusively for women in 1837.

1818
 India: Western Christian missionaries opened the first western-style charter schools in India open to girls.

1822
 Serbia: Girls were allowed to attend elementary schools with boys up until the fourth grade.

1823
 Argentina: The Sociedad de Beneficencia de Buenos Aires was charged by the government to establish and control (private) elementary schools for girls (they retain the control of the schools for girls until 1876).

1826
 United States: The first American public high schools for girls were opened in New York and Boston.

1827
 Brazil: The first elementary schools for girls and the profession of school teacher were opened.

1829
 United States: The first public examination of an American girl in geometry was held.

1830s
 Egypt: Christian missionaries were allowed to open elementary schools for girls.

1831
 United States: As a private institution in 1831, Mississippi College became the first coeducational college in the United States to grant a degree to a woman. In December 1831 it granted degrees to two women, Alice Robinson and Catherine Hall.

1834
 Greece: Got compulsory prime education for both boys and girls, in parallel with the foundation of the first private secondary educational schools for girls, such as the Arsakeio.

1834
 Iran: The Fiske Seminary, first school for girls, was opened in Urmia.

1837
 United States: Bradford Academy in Bradford, Massachusetts, due to declining enrollment, became a single-sexed institution for the education of women exclusively.
 United States: Mount Holyoke College in South Hadley, Massachusetts, opens as Mount Holyoke Seminary. Founded by Mary Lyons, it becomes the one of the first institutions of higher learning for women in the United States.

1839
 United States: Established in 1836, Georgia Female College in Macon, Georgia, opened its doors to students on January 7, 1839. Now known as Wesleyan College, it was the first college in the world chartered specifically to grant bachelor's degrees to women.

1840s
 Denmark: In the 1840s, schools for girls spread outside the capital and a net of secondary education girl schools was established in Denmark.

1841
 Bulgaria: The first secular girls school made education and the profession of teacher available for women.

1842
 Sweden: Requires compulsory elementary school for both sexes.
 Singapore: Maria Dyer founded the oldest girls' school in Singapore. It was known as the "Chinese Girls' School" when it was founded in 1842 (it still exists called St. Margaret's Secondary School).

1843
 Ghana: Catherine Mulgrave arrived on the Gold Coast from Jamaica and subsequently established three boarding schools for girls at Osu (1843), Abokobi (1855) and Odumase (1859) between 1843 and 1891.

1844
 Finland: The foundation of the Svenska fruntimmersskolan i Åbo and its sister school Svenska fruntimmersskolan i Helsingfors in Helsinki.

1846
 Denmark: The first college for women in Denmark, the teachers seminary Den højere Dannelsesanstalt for Damer, was opened in 1846.

1847
 Belgium: Elementary school for both genders.
 Costa Rica: First high school for girls, and the profession of teacher was opened to women.
Ghana: Rosina Widmann opens a vocational school for girls in January 1847, with the first classes in needlework for 12 girls at her home in Akropong in the Gold Coast colony.

1848
 India: Elementary school for girls, Bhide Wada, in Pune by Savitribai Phule and her husband.

1849
 United States: Elizabeth Blackwell, born in England, became the first woman to earn a medical degree from an American college, Geneva Medical College in New York.
 United Kingdom: Bedford College opens in London as the first higher education college for women in the United Kingdom.
 India: Secondary education for girls was made available by the foundation of the Bethune College.

1850–1874
1850
 United States: Lucy Stanton earned a literary degree from Oberlin College, becoming the first Black woman in the United States to receive a college degree.
 France: Elementary education for both sexes, but girls were only allowed to be tutored by teachers from the church.
United Kingdom: North London Collegiate School, the first school in England to offer girls the same educational opportunities as boys, opens.
 Haiti: First permanent school for girls, the l'Institution Mont-Carmel, founded by Marie-Rose Léodille Delaunay.

1851

 Ghana: Regina Hesse moved into the household of her mentor, Catherine Mulgrave and her spouse, Johannes Zimmermann to understudy the methods of pedagogy. She later became the de facto principal of Mulgrave's girls' school at Christiansborg.

1852
 Nicaragua: Josefa Vega is granted dispensation to attend lectures at university, after which women are given the right to apply for permission to attend lectures at university (though not to an actual full university education).

1853
 Egypt: The first Egyptian school for females was opened by Copts.
 Serbia: The first secondary educational school for females was inaugurated (public schools for girls having opened in 1845–46).
 Sweden: The profession of teacher at public primary and elementary schools was opened to both sexes.

1854
 Chile: First public elementary school for girls.

1855
 United States: University of Iowa becomes the first coeducational public or state university in the United States.

1857
 Netherlands: Elementary education compulsory for both girls and boys.
 Spain: Elementary education compulsory for both girls and boys.

1858
 United States: Mary Fellows became the first woman west of the Mississippi River to receive a baccalaureate degree.
 Ottoman Empire: The first state school for girls is opened; several other schools for girls are opened during the following decades.
 Russia: Gymnasiums for girls.

1859
 Denmark: The post of teacher at public schools are opened to women.
 Ghana: Rose Ann Miller started an all-girls' boarding school at Aburi under the auspices of the Basel Mission.
 Sweden: The post of college teacher and lower official at public institutions are open to women.

1860
 Norway: Women are allowed to teach in the rural elementary school system (in the city schools in 1869).

1861
 Sweden: The first public institution of higher academic learning for women, the Royal Seminary, is opened.

1862
 United States: Mary Jane Patterson became the first African-American woman to earn a BA in 1862. She earned her degree from Oberlin College.

1863
 Serbia: The inauguration of the Women's High School in Belgrade, first high school open to women in Serbia (and the entire Balkans).
 United States: Mary Corinna Putnam Jacobi graduated from the New York College of Pharmacy in 1863, which made her the first woman to graduate from a United States school of pharmacy.

1864
 United States: Rebecca Lee Crumpler became the first African-American woman to graduate from a U.S. college with a medical degree and the first and only Black woman to obtain the Doctress of Medicine degree from New England Female Medical College in Boston, Massachusetts.
 Belgium: The first official secondary education school open to females in Belgium.
 Haiti: Elementary schools for girls are founded.

1865
 Romania: The educational reform granted all Romanians access to education, which, at least formally, gave also females the right to attend school from elementary education to the university.

1866
 Sweden: The Girls' School Committee of 1866 is established.
 United States: Lucy Hobbs Taylor became the first American woman to earn a dental degree, which she earned from the Ohio College of Dental Surgery.

1866
  United States: Sarah Jane Woodson Early became the first African-American woman to serve as a professor. Xenia, Ohio's Wilberforce University hired her to teach Latin and English in 1866.

1867
 Switzerland: University of Zurich formally open to women, though they had already been allowed to attend lectures a few years prior.

1868
 Croatia: The first high school open to females.

1869
 United States: Fanny Jackson Coppin was named principal of the Institute for Colored Youth in Philadelphia, becoming the first Black woman to head an institution for higher learning in the United States.
 Austria-Hungary: The profession of public school teacher is open to women.
 Costa Rica: Elementary education compulsory for both girls and boys.
 Ottoman Empire: The law formally introduce compulsory elementary education for both boys and girls.
 Russia: University courses for women are opened, which opens the profession of teacher, law assistant and similar lower academic professions for women (in 1876, the courses are no longer allowed to give exams, and in 1883, all outside of the capital is closed).
 United Kingdom: Watt Institution and School of Arts, a predecessor of Heriot-Watt University, admits women. Mary Burton persuaded the Watt Institution and School of Arts to open its doors to women students in 1869 and went on to become the first woman on the school's Board of Directors and a life governor of Heriot-Watt College.
  United Kingdom: The Edinburgh Seven were the first group of matriculated undergraduate female students at any British university. They began studying medicine at the University of Edinburgh in 1869 and although they were unsuccessful in their struggle to graduate and qualify as doctors, the campaign they fought gained national attention and won them many supporters, including Charles Darwin. It put the rights of women to a university education on the national political agenda which eventually resulted in legislation to ensure that women could study at university in 1877.
 United Kingdom: Girton College opens as the first residential college for women in the United Kingdom.

1870:
 United States: The first woman is admitted to Cornell University.
 United States: The Board of Regents of the University of California ruled that women should be admitted on an equal basis with men. With the completion of North and South Halls in 1873, the university relocated to its Berkeley location with 167 male and 22 female students. 
 Finland: Women allowed to study at the universities by dispensation (dispensation demand dropped in 1901).
 United States: Ada Kepley became the first American woman to earn a law degree, from Northwestern University Pritzker School of Law.
 United States: Ellen Swallow Richards became the first American woman to earn a degree in chemistry, which she earned from Vassar College in 1870.
 Ottoman Empire: The Teachers College for Girls are opened in Constantinople to educate women as professional teachers for girls school; the profession of teacher becomes accessible for women and education accessible to girls.
 Spain: The Asociación para la Enseñanza de la Mujer is founded, promoting education for women, it establishes secondary schools and training colleges all over Spain, which makes secondary and higher education open to females for the first time.
 Sweden: Universities open to women (at the same terms as men 1873). The first female student is Betty Pettersson.

1871

 Netherlands: Aletta Jacobs became the first female to get accepted at the University of Groningen. 
 United States: Frances Willard became the first female college president in the United States, as president of Evanston College for Ladies in Illinois.
 India: First training school for women teachers.
 Japan: Women are allowed to study in the USA (though not yet in Japan itself).
 New Zealand: Universities open to women.
 United States: Harriette Cooke became the first woman college professor in the United States appointed full professor with a salary equal to that of her male peers.

1872:
 Sweden: First female university student: Betty Pettersson.
 Japan: Compulsory elementary education for both girls and boys.
 Ottoman Empire: The first government primary school open to both genders.  Women's Teacher's Training School opened in Istanbul.
 Russia: Establishment of the Guerrier Courses.
 Spain: María Elena Maseras is allowed to enlist as a university student with special dispensation: having been formally admitted to a class in 1875, she was finally allowed to graduate in 1882, which created a precedent allowing females to enroll at universities from this point on.

1873:
 United States: Linda Richards became the first American woman to earn a degree in nursing.
 Egypt: The first public Egyptian primary school open to females. Two years later, there are 32 primary schools for females in Egypt, three of which also offered secondary education.

1874–1899
1874:
 United States: The first woman to graduate from the University of California, Rosa L. Scrivner, obtained a Ph.B. (Bachelor of Philosophy) in Agriculture.
 Iran: The first school for girls is founded by American missionaries (only non-Muslims attend until 1891).
 Japan: The profession of public school teacher is opened to women.
 Netherlands: Aletta Jacobs becomes the first woman allowed to study medicine.
 United Kingdom: London School of Medicine for Women founded, the first medical school in Britain to train women.
 Germany: Russian mathematician Sofya Kovalevskaya became the first woman in modern Europe to gain a doctorate in mathematics, which she earned from the University of Göttingen.
 Canada: Grace Annie Lockhart became the first woman in the British Empire to receive a bachelor's degree, graduating from Mount Allison University in Canada.

1875:
 Switzerland: Stefania Wolicka, a Polish woman, became the first woman to earn a PhD from the University of Zurich in Switzerland.
 Denmark: Universities open to women.
 India: First women admitted to college courses, although with special permission (at Madras Medical College).

1876:
 Argentina: Girls are included in the national school system by the transference of the control of the private girls schools from the charitable Beneficent Society to the provincial government.
 Great Britain: Medical examining bodies given the right to certify women.
 India: Women allowed to attend university exams at the Calcutta University.
 Italy: Universities open to women.
 Netherlands: Universities open to women.
 United Kingdom: University College, Bristol (now the University of Bristol) opened as the first co-educational university college in England.
 United States: Elizabeth Bragg was the first female to graduate from an engineering degree in the U.S. in civil engineering from the University of California, Berkeley.
 United States: Anna Oliver was the first woman to receive a Bachelor of Divinity degree from an American seminary: Boston University School of Theology.

1877:
 United States: Helen Magill White became the first American woman to earn a Ph.D., which she earned at Boston University in the subject of Greek.
 Chile: Universities open to women.
 New Zealand: Kate Edger became the first women to graduate from a university in New Zealand.

1878:
 Austria-Hungary: Women allowed to attend university lectures as guest auditors.
 Bulgaria: Elementary education for both genders.
 Russia: The Bestuzhev Courses open in Saint Petersburg. 
 United Kingdom: Lady Margaret Hall, the first college in the University of Oxford to admit women, is founded.
 United States: Mary L. Page became the first American woman to earn a degree in architecture, which she earned from the University of Illinois Urbana-Champaign.
 United Kingdom: The University of London receives a supplemental charter allowing it to award degrees to women, the first university in the United Kingdom to open its degrees.

1879:
  United States: Mary Eliza Mahoney became the first African-American in the U.S. to earn a diploma in nursing, which she earned from the School of Nursing at the New England Hospital for Women and Children in Boston.
  Brazil: Universities open to women.
  France: Colleges and secondary education open to women.
  India: The first college open to women: Bethune College (the first female graduate in 1883).

1880:
  United Kingdom: First four women gain BA degrees at the University of London, the first women in the UK to be awarded degrees.
 Australia: Universities open to women.
  Belgium: The University of Brussels opened to women.
  Canada: Universities open to women.
  France: Universities open to women.
  France: Free public secondary education to women.
  France: Public teachers training schools open to women.

1881:
  United Kingdom: Women were allowed to take the Cambridge Mathematical Tripos exams, after Charlotte Scott was unofficially ranked as eighth wrangler.
 United States: American Association of University Women is founded.

1882:
 United Kingdom: College Hall opened as a hall of residence for women students in London, primarily for students at University College London and the London School of Medicine for Women; became an official University of London student hall in 2010.
 France: Compulsory elementary education for both genders.
 Norway: Women allowed to study at the university.
 Nicaragua: The first public secular education institution for women, Colegio de Señoritas, opens.
 Poland: The Flying University provides academic education for women.
 Serbia: Compulsory education for both genders.
 Belgium: Universities open to women.
 India: Bombay University open to women.
 Romania: Universities open to women.

1883:
 Australia: Bella Guerin became the first woman to graduate from a university in Australia, graduating from the University of Melbourne in 1883.
 Sweden: Ellen Fries became the first female Ph.D. promoted.
 United States: Susan Hayhurst became the first woman to receive a pharmacy degree in the United States, which she received from the University of the Sciences in Philadelphia. 
 United Kingdom: Sophie Bryant becomes the first woman in Britain to earn a D.Sc. (Doctor of Science).
1885:
 Sierra Leone: Adelaide Casely-Hayford became the first African woman to study music at the Stuttgart Conservatory. 
1886:
 United States: Winifred Edgerton Merrill became the first American woman to earn a PhD in mathematics, which she earned from Columbia University.
 France: Women eligible to join public education boards.
 Costa Rica: A public academic educational institution open to women.
 Korea: The first educational institution for women, Ewha Womans University is founded.
 Mexico: Universities open to women.
 United States: Anandibai Joshi from India, Kei Okami from Japan, and Sabat Islambouli from Syria became the first women from their respective countries (and in Joshi's case the first Hindu woman) to get a degree in western medicine, which they each got from the Woman's Medical College of Pennsylvania, where they were all students in 1885.
 France: Iulia Hasdeu was the first Romanian woman to study at the Sorbonne. She enrolled at age 16 and died two years later while preparing her doctoral thesis.

1887:
 Albania: The first Albanian language elementary school open to female pupils.

1889:
 United States: Maria Louise Baldwin became the first African-American female principal in Massachusetts and the Northeast, supervising white faculty and a predominantly white student body at the Agassiz Grammar School in Cambridge.
 United States: Susan La Flesche Picotte became the first Native American woman to earn a medical degree, which she earned from Woman's Medical College of Pennsylvania.
 Egypt: The first teacher training college for women.
 Argentina: Cecilia Grierson became the first woman in Argentina to earn a medical university degree.
 Palestine: The first school open to girls founded by missionaries.
 Sweden: Women eligible to join boards of public authority, such as public school boards.
 Sweden: First female professor: Sofya Kovalevskaya.
 United Kingdom: Scottish universities opened to women by the Universities (Scotland) Act 1889.
 El Salvador: Antonia Navarro Huezo became the first Salvadoran woman to earn a topographic engineering doctorate.

1890:
  United States: Ida Gray became the first African-American woman to earn a Doctor of Dental Surgery degree, which she earned from the University of Michigan.
 Finland: Signe Hornborg graduates as an architect from the Helsinki University of Technology in Finland, becoming the first ever formally qualified female architect in the world.
 Bohemia: The first secondary education school for females in Prague.
 Greece: Universities open to women.

1891:
 Albania: The first school of higher education for women is opened. It was founded by siblings Sevasti and Gjerasim Qiriazi.
 Germany: Women are allowed to attend university lectures, which makes it possible for individual professors to accept female students if they wish.
 Portugal: The first medical university degree is granted to a woman.
 Switzerland: Secondary schools open to women.
 Ecuador: Juana Miranda, an obstetrician, becomes the Republic's first female university professor; she teaches at the Central University of Ecuador's medical school.

1892:
 United States: Laura Eisenhuth became the first woman elected to state office as Superintendent of Public Instruction.

1893:
 Ottoman Empire: Women are permitted to attend medical lectures at Istanbul University.
 France: Dorothea Klumpke became the first woman to be awarded a doctorate in sciences.

1894:
 Poland: Kraków University open to women.
 United States: Margaret Floy Washburn became the first American woman to be officially awarded the PhD degree in psychology, which she earned at Cornell University.

1895:
 Austria-Hungary: Universities open to women.
 Egypt: A public school system for girls is organized.

1896:
 Norway: Women are admitted at all secondary educational schools of the state.
 Spain: María Goyri de Menéndez Pidal became the first Spanish woman to earn a degree in philosophy and letters. She earned a licentiate from the University of Madrid.

1897:
 Switzerland: Anita Augspurg became the first German woman to receive a Doctor of Law, which earned at the University of Zurich, despite not being able to practice law in Germany until 1922.
 Austria-Hungary: Gabriele Possanner became the first woman to receive a medical degree and, subsequently, the first practicing female doctor of the country.

1898:
 Haiti: The Medical University accepts female students in obstetrics.
 Serbia: Co-education, banned since the 1850s, is re-introduced, equalizing the schooling of males and females.
 United Kingdom: Margaret Murray became the first woman lecturer of archaeology in the United Kingdom.

1899:
 Germany: Women are admitted to study medicine, dentistry and pharmacy.

1900s

1900–1939
1900:
  Egypt: A school for female teachers is founded in Cairo.
  United States: Otelia Cromwell became the first black woman to graduate from Smith College in Northampton, Massachusetts.
  Tunisia: The first public elementary school for girls.
  Japan: The first Women's University.
  Baden, Germany: Universities open to women.
  Sri Lanka: Secondary education open to females.

1901:
  Bulgaria: Universities open to women.
  Cuba: Universities open to women.

1902:
  Australia: Ada Evans became the first woman to graduate in law in Australia at the University of Sydney.

1903:
  United States: Mignon Nicholson became the first woman in North America to earn a veterinary degree, which she earned from McKillip Veterinary College in Chicago, Illinois.
 Canada: Clara Benson and Emma Sophia Baker became the first women to earn a PhD from the University of Toronto.
 Norway: Clara Holst became the first woman to earn a Ph.D. in Norway, which she earned from Royal Frederick University. Her dissertation was titled Studier over middelnedertyske laaneord i dansk i det 14. og 15. aarhundrede (English: Study of Middle Low German loanwords in Danish in the 14th and 15th centuries).

1904:
  United States: Helen Keller graduated from Radcliffe, becoming the first deafblind person to earn a Bachelor of Arts degree.
  United Kingdom: Millicent Mackenzie is appointed as Assistant Professor of Education at the University College of South Wales and Monmouthshire (part of the University of Wales), the first woman professor in the UK.
  Württemberg, Germany: Universities open to women.

1905:
  United States: Nora Stanton Blatch Barney, born in England, became the one of the first woman to earn a degree in any type of engineering in the United States, which she earned from Cornell University. It was a degree in civil engineering.
  Argentina: University preparatory secondary education open to females.
  Iceland: Educational institutions open to women.
  Russia: Universities open to women.
  Serbia: Female university students are fully integrated in to the university system.
 Australia: Flos Greig became the first woman to be admitted as a barrister and solicitor in Australia, having graduated in 1903.

1906:
  Saxony, Germany: Universities open to women.

1907:
  China: Girls are included in the education system.
  Sudan: The first school open to Muslim girls.
  Iran: Compulsory primary education for females.
  Iran: The first Iranian school for girls is established by Tuba Azmudeh, followed by others in the following years.
  Japan: Tohoku University, the first (private) coeducational university.
 Italy: Rina Monti is named the first female university chair in the Kingdom of Italy.

1908:
  United States: Alpha Kappa Alpha sorority, the first black Greek letter organization for women, was founded at Howard University.
  United Kingdom: Edith Morley is appointed Professor of English Language at University College Reading, becoming the first full professor at a British university institute.
  Korea: Secondary education for females through the foundation of the Capital School for Girl's Higher Education.
  Peru: Universities open to women.
  Prussia, Alsace-Lorraine and Hesse, Germany: Universities open to women.
Switzerland: The Russian-born Anna Tumarkin was the first female professor in Europe with the right to examine doctoral and post-doctoral students.

1909:
  United States: Ella Flagg Young became the first female superintendent of a large city school system in the United States.
 Spain: María Goyri de Menéndez Pidal became the first woman to earn a Ph.D. in Spain, which she earned at the University of Madrid in the subject of philosophy and letters.

1910:
  United Kingdom: Millicent Mackenzie is promoted to full professor, the first woman to reach this level at a fully chartered university in the UK.

1911:
  Luxembourg: A new educational law gives women access to higher education, and two secondary education schools open to females.

1912:
  China: The Chinese government established secondary schools for young women.
  Costa Rica: Felícitas Chaverri Matamoros becomes the first female university student of the country in the Pharmacy School; in 1917 she becomes the first Costa Rican female university graduate.
Japan: Tsuruko Haraguchi became the first Japanese woman to earn a Ph.D.

1913:
  United Kingdom: Caroline Spurgeon successfully competed for the newly created chair of English Literature at Bedford College, London, becoming the second female professor in England.

1914:
 Sierra Leone: Kathleen Mary Easmon Simango became the first West African woman to become an Associate of the Royal College of Art.

1915:
  United States: Lillian Gilbreth earned a PhD in industrial psychology from Brown University, which was the first degree ever granted in industrial psychology. Her dissertation was titled "Some Aspects of Eliminating Waste in Teaching".

1917:
  Greece: The first public secondary educational school for girls open.
  Iran: Public schools for girls are opened in order to enforce the law of compulsory education for girls in practice.
  Uruguay: University education open to women.
  Nicaragua: The first female obtains a university degree.

1918:
  Thailand: Universities open to women.

1920:
  Portugal: Secondary school open to women.
  China: The first female students are accepted in the Peking University, soon followed by universities all over China.

1921:
  United States: Sadie Tanner Mossell became the first African-American woman to earn a Ph.D. in the U.S. when she earned a Ph.D. in Economics from the University of Pennsylvania.
  Thailand: Compulsory elementary education for both girls and boys.

1922:
  United States: Sigma Gamma Rho sorority was founded. It was the fourth black Greek letter organization for women, and the first black sorority established on a predominantly white campus, Butler University in Indianapolis, Indiana.

1923:
  Canada: Elsie MacGill graduated from the University of Toronto in 1927, and was the first Canadian woman to earn a degree in electrical engineering.
  Egypt: Compulsory education for both sexes.
  United States: Virginia Proctor Powell Florence became the first black woman in the United States to earn a degree in library science. She earned the degree (Bachelor of Library Science) from what is now part of the University of Pittsburgh.
  Australia: Winifred Kiek was the first woman to graduate with a bachelor of divinity from the Melbourne College of Divinity.
  Australia: Violet McKenzie was the first woman in Australia to gain a diploma in electrical engineering. She earned the qualification for from Sydney Technical College which is now known as TAFE New South Wales Sydney Institute.

1924
 Russia: Olga Freidenberg was the first woman in Russia to earn a Ph.D. in classical philology, which she earned from Petrograd University.

1925:
  Korea: Professional school for women (at Ewha Womans University).

1926:
  United States: Dr. May Edward Chinn became the first African-American woman to graduate from the University and Bellevue Hospital Medical College.

1927:
  Afghanistan: The monarch introduces compulsory education for the daughters of officials.

1928:
  Afghanistan: The first women are sent abroad to study (women banned from studying abroad in 1929).
  Bahrain: The first public primary school for girls.
  Egypt: The first women students are admitted to Cairo University.
  Ghana: Jane E. Clerk was one of two students in the first batch of Presbyterian Women's Training College.

1929:
  Greece: Secondary education for females is made equal to that of males.
  Nigeria: Agnes Yewande Savage became the first West African woman to graduate from medical school, obtaining her degree at the University of Edinburgh.
  United States: Jenny Rosenthal Bramley, born in Moscow, became the first woman to earn a Ph.D. in physics in the United States, which she earned from New York University.
  United States: Elsie MacGill, from Canada, became the first woman in North America, and likely the world, to be awarded a master's degree in aeronautical engineering.

1930:
  Turkey: Equal right to university education for both men and women.
  Australia: Physician and zoologist Claire Weekes was the first woman to gain a doctorate of science at the University of Sydney.

1931:
  United States: Jane Matilda Bolin was the first black woman to graduate from Yale Law School.
  United States: Bradford Academy, in Bradford, Massachusetts, changed name to Bradford Junior College and offered a two-year degree for women.

1932:
  United States: Dorothy B. Porter became the first African-American woman to earn an advanced degree in library science (MLS) from Columbia University.

1933:
  Sierra Leone: Edna Elliott-Horton became the first West African woman to receive a baccalaureate degree in the liberals arts when she graduated from Howard University.
  United States: Inez Beverly Prosser became the first African-American woman to earn a PhD in psychology, which she earned from the University of Cincinnati.

1934:
  United States: Ruth Winifred Howard became the second African-American woman in the United States to receive a Ph.D. in psychology, which she earned from the University of Minnesota.

1935:
 Iran: Women were admitted to Tehran University. The access of university education to females is, in fact, also a reform regarding women's access to professions, as it open numerous professions to women.
  United States: Jesse Jarue Mark became the first African American woman to earn a Ph.D. in botany, which she earned at Iowa State University.

1936:
  United States: Flemmie Kittrell became the first African American woman to earn a Ph.D. in nutrition, which she earned at Cornell University.

1937:
  Kuwait: The first public schools open to females.
  United States: Anna Johnson Julian became the first black woman to receive a Ph.D. in sociology from the University of Pennsylvania.
1938:
 Nigeria: Elizabeth Abimbola Awoliyi became the first woman to be licensed to practise medicine in Nigeria after graduating from the University of Dublin and the first West African female medical officer with a license of the Royal Surgeon (Dublin).

1939:

 United Kingdom: Dorothy Garrod becomes the Disney Professor of Archaeology at the University of Cambridge, making her the first female professor at either Oxford or Cambridge.

1940–1969
1940:
  United States: Roger Arliner Young became the first black woman to earn a Ph.D. in zoology, which she earned from the University of Pennsylvania.

1941:
  United States: Ruth Lloyd became the first African-American woman to earn a Ph.D. in anatomy, which she earned from Western Reserve University.
  United States: Merze Tate became the first African American woman to earn a Ph.D. in government and international relations from Harvard University.

1942:
  United States: Margurite Thomas became the first African American woman to earn a Ph.D. in geology, which she earned from Catholic University.

1943:
  Iran: Compulsory primary education for both males and females.
  United States: Euphemia Haynes became the first African-American woman to earn a Ph.D. in Mathematics, which she earned from Catholic University.

1945:
  United States: Zora Neale Hurston became the first African-American woman to be admitted to Barnard college.
  United States: Harvard Medical School admitted women for the first time.
1946:
  Ghana: Jane E. Clerk was among a batch of pioneer women educators in West Africa to selected study education at the Institute of Education of the University of London.
1947:
 Ghana: Susan Ofori-Atta became the first Ghanaian woman to earn a medical degree when she graduated from the University of Edinburgh.
United States: Marie Maynard Daly became the first African-American woman to earn a Ph.D. in chemistry, which she earned from Columbia University.
  United Kingdom: Cambridge University becomes the last university in the UK to allow women to take full degrees.

1948:
 United Kingdom: Elizabeth Hill became the first Professor of Slavonic studies at the University of Cambridge.

1949:
 United States: Joanne Simpson (formerly Joanne Malkus, born Joanne Gerould) was the first woman in the United States to receive a Ph.D. in meteorology, which she received in 1949 from the University of Chicago.

1950:
 Ghana: Matilda J. Clerk became the first woman in Ghana and West Africa to attend graduate school, earning a postgraduate diploma at the London School of Hygiene & Tropical Medicine.
 Ghana: Annie Jiagge, the first woman in the Commonwealth of Nations to become a judge, was called to the Bar at Lincoln's Inn.

1951:
 Bahrain: First secondary education school open to females.
 Ghana: Esther Afua Ocloo became the first person of African ancestry to obtain a cooking diploma from the Good Housekeeping Institute in London and to take the post-graduate Food Preservation Course at Long Ashton Research Station, Department of Horticulture, Bristol University.
 United States: Maryly Van Leer Peck, became first female chemical engineer graduate. Peck also became the first woman to receive an M.S. and a Ph.D. in chemical engineering from the University of Florida.

1952: 
 United States: Georgia Tech's president Blake R. Van Leer admitted the first women to the school and his wife Ella Wall Van Leer setup support groups for future female engineers.

1955:
 Qatar: First public school for girls.

1957:

 Southern Rhodesia (today Zimbabwe): Sarah Chavunduka became the first black woman to attend the University College of Rhodesia and Nyasaland (today the University of Zimbabwe).

1959:

 United States: Lois Graham becomes the first US woman to earn a PhD in mechanical engineering.

1962:
 United States: Martha E. Bernal, who was born in Texas, became the first Latina to earn a PhD in psychology, which she earned in clinical psychology from Indiana University Bloomington.
  Kuwait: The right to education is secured to all citizens regardless of gender.

1963:
  Nigeria: Grace Alele-Williams became the first Nigerian woman to earn any doctorate when she earned her Ph.D. in Mathematics Education from the University of Chicago.
  The Gambia: Florence Mahoney became the first Gambian woman to obtain a PhD, graduating from the School of Oriental and African Studies with a doctorate in History.
  Australia: Mary Lockett became the first woman appointed as a professor at the University of Western Australia when she was made Wellcome Foundation research professor of pharmacology.

1964:
 Afghanistan: The 1964 constitution stated the equal right of women to education.

1965:
 United States: Sister Mary Kenneth Keller became the first American woman to earn a PhD in Computer Science, which she earned at the University of Wisconsin–Madison. Her thesis was titled "Inductive Inference on Computer Generated Patterns".
 Kuwait: Compulsory education for both boys and girls.

1966:
 Kuwait: University education open to women.

1969:
 United States: In 1969, Lillian Lincoln Lambert became the first African-American woman to graduate from Harvard Business School with an MBA.
 United States: Princeton, Yale, Colgate, Johns Hopkins, and Georgetown opened applications to women.

1970–1999
1970:
  United States: Bowdoin, Williams and the University of Virginia allowed women to apply for admittance.
1971:
  United States: Bradford Junior College in Bradford, Massachusetts changed to Bradford College and offered four year degrees for women.
  Egypt: The new constitution confirms women's right to education.
  United States: Brown and Lehigh allowed women to apply for admittance.

1972:
  United States: Title IX was passed, making discrimination against any person based on their sex in any federally funded educational program(s) in America illegal.
  United States: Willie Hobbs Moore became the first African-American woman to receive a Ph.D. in Physics, which was conferred by the University of Michigan.
  United States: Bradford College in Bradford, Massachusetts became a co-educational institution (again) after being founded in 1803 as co-educational and then serving exclusively as a female institution of higher learning from 1837 to 1972. Bradford College closed permanently in May, 2000. The Bradford Alumni Association continues today and is the third oldest continuing alumni association in the United States.
  United States: Dartmouth, Davidson, Duke and Wesleyan allowed women to apply for admittance.

1975:
  United States: Lorene L. Rogers became the first woman named president of a major research university in the United States, the University of Texas.
  United States: On July 1, 1975, Jeanne Sinkford became the first female dean of a dental school when she was appointed the dean of Howard University, School of Dentistry.
  United Kingdom: The Sex Discrimination Act 1975 (c. 65) is an Act of the Parliament of the United Kingdom which protected women from discrimination on the grounds of sex or marital status. The Act concerned education among other things.
  United States: Amherst, Claremont, US Naval Academy, West Point, US Airforce Academy and US Coast Guard Academy allowed women to apply for admittance.

1976:
  United States: U.S. service academies (US Military Academy, US Naval Academy, US Air Force Academy and the US Coast Guard Academy) first admitted women in 1976.

1977:
  United States: Harvard's ratio of four men to one woman ended with "sex-blind admissions".
  United States: The American Association of Dental Schools (founded in 1923 and renamed the American Dental Education Association in 2000) had Nancy Goorey as its first female president in 1977.

1978:
 Afghanistan: Mandatory literacy and education of all females.

1979:
  United States: Christine Economides became the first American woman to receive a PhD in petroleum engineering, which was conferred by Stanford University.
  United States: Jenny Patrick became the first black woman in the United States to receive a Ph.D. in chemical engineering, which was conferred by Massachusetts Institute of Technology.

1980:
  United States: Women and men were enrolled in American colleges in equal numbers for the first time.

1982:
  United States: The number of bachelor's degrees conferred on women first surpassed those conferred on men.
  United States: Mississippi University for Women v. Hogan, 458 U.S. 718 (1982) was a case decided 5–4 by the Supreme Court of the United States. The court held that the single-sex admissions policy of the Mississippi University for Women violated the Equal Protection Clause of the Fourteenth Amendment to the United States Constitution.
  United States: Judith Hauptman became the first woman to earn a PhD in Talmud, which she earned from the Jewish Theological Seminary in New York.

1983:
  United States: Christine Darden became the first black woman in the U.S. to receive a Ph.D. degree in mechanical engineering, which was conferred by George Washington University.
  United States: Columbia College of Columbia University allowed women to apply for admittance.

1984:
  United States: The U.S. Supreme Court's 1984 ruling Grove City College v. Bell held that Title IX applied only to those programs receiving direct federal aid.  The case reached the Supreme Court when Grove City College disagreed with the Department of Education's assertion that it was required to comply with Title IX. Grove City College was not a federally funded institution; however, they did accept students who were receiving Basic Educational Opportunity Grants through a Department of Education program. The Department of Education's stance was that, because some of its students were receiving federal grants, the school was receiving federal assistance and Title IX applied to it. The Court decided that since Grove City College was only receiving federal funding through the grant program, only that program had to be in compliance. The ruling was a major victory for those opposed to Title IX, as it made many institutions' sports programs outside of the rule of Title IX and, thus, reduced the scope of Title IX.

1987:
  United States: Johnnetta Cole became the first black president of Spelman College.

1988:
 United States: The Civil Rights Restoration Act was passed in 1988 which extended Title IX coverage to all programs of any educational institution that receives any federal assistance, both direct and indirect.

1994:
 United States: In 1994, the Equity in Athletics Disclosure Act, sponsored by congresswoman Cardiss Collins, required federally assisted higher education institutions to disclose information on roster sizes for men's and women's teams, as well as budgets for recruiting, scholarships, coaches' salaries, and other expenses, annually.

1996:
 United States: United States v. Virginia, was a landmark case in which the Supreme Court of the United States struck down the Virginia Military Institute (VMI)'s long-standing male-only admission policy in a 7–1 decision. (Justice Clarence Thomas, whose son was enrolled at VMI at the time, recused himself.)

2000s
2001:
 United States: Ruth Simmons became the eighteenth president of Brown University, which made her the first black woman to lead an Ivy League institution.

2005–2006:
 United States: For the first time, more doctoral degrees are conferred on women then men in the United States. This educational gap has continued to increase in the U.S., especially for master's degrees where over 50% more degrees are conferred on women than men.

2006:
 United States: On November 24, 2006, the Title IX regulations were amended to provide greater flexibility in the operation of single-sex classes or extracurricular activities at the primary or secondary school level.

2011:
 India: In April 2011, the Institute for Buddhist Dialectical Studies (IBD) in Dharamsala, India, conferred the degree of geshe (a Tibetan Buddhist academic degree for monks and nuns) to Venerable Kelsang Wangmo, a German nun, thus making her the world's first female geshe.

2013:
 Saudi Arabia: The Saudi government sanctioned sports for girls in private schools for the first time.
 Saudi Arabia: Mai Majed Al-Qurashi became the first woman to receive a PhD in Saudi Arabia, which was conferred by the King Abdullah University of Science and Technology.
 United Kingdom: It was announced that Ephraim Mirvis created the job of ma'ayan by which women would be advisers on Jewish law in the area of family purity and as adult educators in Orthodox synagogues. This requires a part-time training course for 18 months, which is the first such course in the United Kingdom.
 Tibet: Tibetan women were able to take the geshe exams for the first time.

2016:
 Tibet: Twenty Tibetan Buddhist nuns became the first Tibetan women to receive geshema degrees.

See also
 Female education in the United States
 Timeline of women's legal rights (other than voting)

References

Society-related timelines
History of education
Women and education
education